Live at the Avalon is the second live EP released by rock band Coheed and Cambria. Much like their previous EP, Live at La Zona Rosa, (Which was packaged with In Keeping Secrets of Silent Earth: 3), Live at the Avalon was packaged with their 2005 release Good Apollo... Volume One when bought at Best Buy. However, unlike the Live at La Zona Rosa EP, this was not recorded at a festival of sorts, but during Coheed and Cambria's 2005 summer tour. This EP included two tracks from In Keeping Secrets of Silent Earth: 3 and two from Good Apollo, I'm Burning Star IV, Volume One: From Fear Through the Eyes of Madness.

Track listing
 "Welcome Home" – 5:35
 "Blood Red Summer" –4:26
 "In Keeping Secrets of Silent Earth: 3" –8:35
 "The Willing Well IV: The Final Cut" –12:24

Personnel
Claudio Sanchez: vocals, guitar
Travis Stever: lead guitar, backing vocals
Michael Todd: bass guitar, backing vocals
Josh Eppard: drums, backing vocals

Coheed and Cambria albums
2005 EPs
Live EPs
2005 live albums
Columbia Records live albums
Columbia Records EPs